Nathaniel Harrington Bannister (January 13, 1813 – November 2, 1847) was an American actor and playwright.

Bannister wrote over 40 plays, including Putnam, the Iron Son of '76 (1844) about the American Revolutionary War hero Israel Putnam which played for 78 consecutive nights in New York at the Bowery Theatre (produced by Thomas S. Hamblin), unusually successful for its time.  The bulk of Bannister's many works, only some of which were published, are historical dramas.

Bannister was born in Delaware (some sources report Maryland) in 1813, and made his first appearance on stage in Baltimore at age 16 in the role of Young Norval. He died in poverty in New York on November 2, 1847.

Bannister was married to actress Amelia Greene, who was previously married to John Augustus Stone.

Plays (incomplete list)

 Rathanemus (1835, New Orleans)
 Gaulantus the Gault (1836)
 The Destruction of Jerusalem (1837)
 England's Iron Days (1837)
 The Gentleman of Lyons, or the Marriage Contract (1837)
 The Maine Question (1839)
 Titus Andronicus (1839, adaptation)
 Old English Ironsides
 Robert Emmett
 Murrell, the Land Pirate
 Roman Slaves
 Two Spaniards
 Caius Silius
 Psammetichus, or the Twelve Tribes of Egypt (written for Edwin Forrest)
 The Wandering Jew
 Washington
 Infidelity
 Gustavani
 The Fall of San Antonio
 Tis Freedom's Call
 Adventures of a Sailor
 The Serpent's Glen
 The Midnight Murder
 Surrender of Lord Cornwallis
 Chief of the McIvor
 Texas and Freedom
 Life in New Orleans
 The Three Brothers: Or Crime Its Own Avenger (one act)
 Putnam, the Iron Son of '76 (1844)

See also

 List of playwrights
 List of people from Delaware

References

External links
 Putnam, The Iron Son of '76. New York: Samuel French (via Google Books)>

1813 births
1847 deaths
19th-century American dramatists and playwrights
19th-century American male actors
American male stage actors
Male actors from Delaware
Writers from Delaware
American male dramatists and playwrights
19th-century American male writers